The 52nd Karlovy Vary International Film Festival took place from 30 June to 8 July 2017. The Crystal Globe was won by Little Crusader, a Czech historical drama film directed by Václav Kadrnka. The second prize, the Special Jury Prize was won by Men Don’t Cry, a Bosnian drama film directed by Alen Drljević.

Juries
The following people formed the juries of the festival: 
Main competition
 Anna Brüggemann (Germany)
 Sarah Flack (USA)
 Ciro Guerra (Columbia)
 Michel Merkt (Principality of Monaco)
 Štefan Uhrík (Czech Republic)
Documentaries
 Roberto Cueto (Spain)
 Anne Fabini (Germany)
 Pavla Janoušková Kubečková (Czech Republic)
East of the West
 Evrim Ersoy (Turkey)
 Cosima Finkbeiner (Germany)
 Rusudan Glurjidze (Georgia)
 Igor Soukmanov (Republic of Belarus)
 Karla Stojáková (Czech Republic)

Official selection awards
The following feature films and people received the official selection awards:
 Crystal Globe (Grand Prix) - Little Crusader (Křižáček) by Václav Kadrnka (Czech Republic, Slovak Republic, Italy)
 Special Jury Prize - Men Don’t Cry (Muškarci ne plaču) by Alen Drljević (Bosnia and Herzegovina, Slovenia, Croatia, Germany)
 Best Director Award - Peter Bebjak for The Line (Čiara) (Slovak Republic, Ukraine)
 Best Actress Award (ex aequo) - Jowita Budnik & Eliane Umuhire for their roles in Birds Are Singing in Kigali (Ptaki śpiewają w Kigali) (Poland)
 Best Actor Award - Alexander Yatsenko for his role in Arrhythmia (Aritmiya) (Russia, Finland, Germany)
 Special Jury Mention (Best First Feature Film) - Keep the Change by Rachel Israel (USA)
 Special Jury Mention (Best Newcomer) - Voica Oltean for her role in Breaking News (Romania)

Other statutory awards
Other statutory awards that were conferred at the festival:
 Best documentary film - Lots of Kids, a Monkey and a Castle (Muchos hijos, un mono y un castillo) by Gustavo Salmerón (Spain)
 Special Jury Prize - Atelier de conversation by Bernhard Braunstein (Austria, France, Liechtenstein)
 East of the West Award - How Viktor "the Garlic" Took Alexey "the Stud" to the Nursing Home (Kak Vitka Chesnok vez Lecha Shtyrya v dom invalidov) by  Alexander Hant (Russia)
 Special Jury Prize - Dede by Mariam Khatchvani (Georgia, Qatar, Ireland, Netherlands, Croatia)
 Forum of Independents Award - Tangerine by Sean Baker (USA)
 Crystal Globe for Outstanding Artistic Contribution to World Cinema - Ken Loach (UK), Paul Laverty UK, James Newton Howard (USA)
 Festival President's Award - Uma Thurman (USA), Casey Affleck (USA), Jeremy Renner (USA)
 Festival President's Award for Contribution to Czech Cinematography -Václav Vorlíček (Czech Republic)
 Právo Audience Award - Wind River by Taylor Sheridan (USA)

Non-statutory awards
The following non-statutory awards were conferred at the festival:
 FIPRESCI International Critics Award: Keep the Change by Rachel Israel (USA)
 Ecumenical Jury Award: The Cakemaker by Ofir Raul Graizer (Israel, Germany)
 FEDEORA Award (East of the West section): Mariţa by Cristi Iftime (Romania) 
 Special Mention: Blue Silence by Bülent Öztürk (Turkey, Belgium)
 Europa Cinemas Label: Men Don’t Cry (Muškarci ne plaču) by Alen Drljević (Bosnia and Herzegovina, Slovenia, Croatia, Germany)

References

2017 film awards
Karlovy Vary International Film Festival